The Reptile is a 1966 horror film made by Hammer Film Productions. It was directed by John Gilling, and starred Noel Willman, Jacqueline Pearce, Ray Barrett, Jennifer Daniel, and Michael Ripper.

Plot summary

In the 19th century in the fictional village of Clagmoor Heath in Cornwall several locals are dying from what is deemed to be the "Black Death".  Harry Spalding inherits his late brother Charles' cottage and arrives with his new bride, Valerie. The inhabitants of the village keep clear of the newly arrived couple and only the publican, Tom Bailey, befriends them. Tom explains that the hostility exhibited by the townspeople is the result of many mysterious deaths in the community.

The sinister Dr. Franklyn, the owner of the nearby Well House, is the only resident in the vicinity of the cottage and he lives with his daughter Anna. Franklyn treats Anna with cruel contempt and she is attended by a silent Malay servant.

Hoping to learn something of the deaths, Harry invites the local eccentric, 'Mad' Peter, home for dinner. After warning them that their lives are in danger,  'Mad' Peter quickly departs only to return later that evening with his face blackened and swollen before dying. The Spaldings attempt to alert Franklyn, but he arrogantly states that Peter's death is not his concern, explaining that he is a Doctor of Divinity, not a doctor of medicine.

In an attempt to help Harry clear up the mystery, Tom illegally unearths Peter's corpse and discovers a strange neck wound like a snake bite. Harry and Tom dig up Charles’ coffin and find that his corpse also has those same marks. Realizing that they are threatened by something far worse than they had ever imagined, Harry is quick to answer an urgent message from the Well House.  There, he is bitten by a mysterious reptilian creature, but he still manages to return to his home and recover from the bite.

Meanwhile, at the Well House, Valerie witnesses Franklyn's attempt to kill Anna in the underground cavern where she is covered by a blanket, having shed her skin. A struggle ensues between Franklyn and the Malay, accidentally causing a lantern to be knocked over and setting the house ablaze. Franklyn throws the Malay to his death in the sulphur pool. Franklyn then imprisons Valerie in his study as he tells her how his daughter Anna was changed into the reptile creature after being abducted and cursed by a Malay snake cult that included the Malay servant. Now she sheds her skin every winter and he keeps her warm by keeping her next to the local sulphur pools under Well House.  Upstairs, Franklyn is bitten by Anna and dies from the bite. Anna attempts to bite Valerie too, but succumbs to the cold as Tom Bailey smashes the window from outside; Anna dies in the fire. Harry and Tom arrive and save Valerie. The three escape safely and watch as the house is consumed by the flames.

Cast

 Ray Barrett as Harry George Spalding
 Jennifer Daniel as Valerie Spalding
 Michael Ripper as Tom Bailey
 Noel Willman as Dr. Franklyn
 Jacqueline Pearce as Anna Franklyn
 John Laurie as Mad Peter
 Marne Maitland as The Malay
 David Baron as Charles Edward Spalding
 Charles Lloyd-Pack as The Vicar
 Harold Goldblatt as The Solicitor
 George Woodbridge as Old Garnsey

Production

The production was filmed back to back with The Plague of the Zombies, and used many of the same sets, including exterior shots in the grounds of Oakley Court near Bray, Berkshire (seen burning in the final frames). Pearce and Ripper appeared in both films. The cottage used in the film was located in Brentmoor Road, West End, Woking, Surrey. The heathland shots were of West End & Chobham Common. The railway station glimpsed briefly near the beginning of the film was Loudwater railway station.

As documented in books on Hammer Film's history, actress Jacqueline Pearce disliked wearing the Reptile make-up as she suffered from claustrophobia.  After this film she vowed never to wear "creature" make-up in her future acting projects.

The film was released in some markets on a double feature with Rasputin, the Mad Monk.

A novelization of the film was written by John Burke as part of his 1967 book The Second Hammer Horror Film Omnibus.

Critical reception 
The Hammer Story: The Authorised History of Hammer Films called the film "classic sixties Hammer"; while Allmovie wrote, "there are some inconsistencies in Anthony Hinds' script, but the film is handsomely mounted and delivers its share of shocks" ; Time Out wrote, "it's slower and moodier than its companion-piece (Plague of the Zombies), but strikingly Conan Doyleish in its stately costume horrors. Jacqueline Pearce is terrific"; and British Horror Films said simply, "it's superb". The Monthly Film Bulletin wrote that it "has an unusually controlled dignity for a Hammer production; instead of the customary blood-lettings, we are invited to observe with nervous curiosity the slow self-destruction of a proud but superstitious man incapable of rescuing his daughter from the fate half-wished upon her by himself ... Altogether, a film of quite some merit." Kevin Thomas of the Los Angeles Times panned the film, writing that "the script is too silly for all but the most uncritical."

In other media 
The Reptile was adapted into a 12-page comics story by Steve Moore and Brian Lewis, which was published in Hammer's House of Horror #19, published in April 1978 by Top Sellers Ltd.

References

Sources

External links

The Reptile at BFI Screenonline

1966 films
1966 horror films
1960s fantasy films
British horror films
Dark fantasy films
Folk horror films
Films about shapeshifting
Films set in Cornwall
Films set in the 1900s
Films shot at Bray Studios
20th Century Fox films
Hammer Film Productions horror films
Films directed by John Gilling
Films about snakes
1960s English-language films
1960s British films
Mad scientist films
Films about father–daughter relationships